Florenz Edward Ziegfeld Jr. (March 21, 1867 – July 22, 1932) was an American Broadway impresario, notable for his series of theatrical revues, the Ziegfeld Follies (1907–1931), inspired by the Folies Bergère of Paris. He also produced the musical Show Boat. He was known as the "glorifier of the American girl". Ziegfeld is a member of the American Theater Hall of Fame.

Early life

Florenz Edward Ziegfeld Jr. was born on March 21, 1867, in Chicago, Illinois. His mother, Rosalie (née de Hez), who was born in Belgium, was the grandniece of General Count Étienne Maurice Gérard. His father, Florenz Edward Ziegfeld, was a German immigrant whose father was the mayor of Jever in Friesland. Ziegfeld was baptized in his mother's Roman Catholic church. His father was Lutheran. As a child Ziegfeld witnessed the Chicago fire of 1871.

Career
His father ran the Chicago Musical College and later opened a nightclub, the Trocadero, to profit from the 1893 World's Fair. To help his father's nightclub succeed, Ziegfeld hired and managed the strongman Eugen Sandow.

In London, during a trip to Europe, Ziegfeld met Anna Held, a Polish-French singer. His promotion of Held in America brought about her meteoric rise to national fame. It was Held who first suggested an American imitation of the Parisian Folies Bergère to Ziegfeld. Her success in a series of his Broadway shows, especially A Parisian Model (1906), was a major reason for his starting a series of lavish revues in 1907. Much of Held's popularity was due to Ziegfeld's creation of publicity stunts and rumors fed to the American press.

Ziegfeld's stage spectaculars, known as the Ziegfeld Follies, began with Follies of 1907, which opened on July 7, 1907, and were produced annually until 1931. These extravaganzas, with elaborate costumes and sets, featured beauties chosen personally by Ziegfeld in production numbers choreographed to the works of prominent composers such as Irving Berlin, George Gershwin and Jerome Kern. The Follies featured the famous Ziegfeld girls, female chorus dancers who wore elaborate costumes and performed in synchronization.

The Follies featured many performers who, though well known from previous work in other theatrical genres, achieved unique financial success and publicity with Ziegfeld. Included among these are Nora Bayes, Fanny Brice, Ruth Etting, W. C. Fields, Eddie Cantor, Marilyn Miller, Will Rogers, Bert Williams and Ann Pennington.

At a cost of $2.5 million, Ziegfeld built the 1600-seat Ziegfeld Theatre on the west side of Sixth Avenue between 54th and 55th Streets. Designed by Joseph Urban and Thomas W. Lamb, the auditorium was egg-shaped, with the stage at the narrow end. A huge medieval-style mural, The Joy of Life, covered the walls and ceiling. To finance the construction, Ziegfeld borrowed from William Randolph Hearst, who took control of the theater after Ziegfeld's death.

The Ziegfeld Theatre opened in February 1927 with Ziegfeld's production of Rio Rita, which ran for nearly 500 performances. This was followed by Show Boat, a great hit with a run of 572 performances. This musical, which concerned racial discrimination in the South during the late nineteenth century, was a collaboration between Ziegfeld, Urban, and composer Jerome Kern.  The musical has been revived four times on Broadway, winning multiple Tony Awards. The score features several classics such as "Ol' Man River" and "Can't Help Lovin' Dat Man".

Ziegfeld lost much of his money in the stock market crash. In May 1932 he staged a revival of Show Boat that ran for six months—a hit, by Depression standards. That same year, he brought his Follies stars to CBS Radio with The Ziegfeld Follies of the Air.

Personal life
In 1896, Ziegfeld met Anna Held, an actress, in London. Ziegfeld and Held began a common-law marriage in 1897, and she divorced him in 1913, according to her obituary in The New York Times dated August 13, 1918.  Held served Ziegfeld with divorce papers on April 14, 1912, and their divorce became final on January 9, 1913. Held had submitted testimony about Ziegfeld's relationship with another woman. The unnamed party in this romantic triangle was showgirl Lillian Lorraine, an entertainer of limited talent but charismatic stage presence and beauty whom Ziegfeld discovered in 1907 when she was a 15-year-old performer in a Shubert production. Ziegfeld spent years promoting her career, transforming her into one of the most popular attractions in his Follies and establishing her in an apartment two floors above the residence he shared with Held. He remained in love with Lorraine for the rest of his life. 

Not long after his divorce from Held, Ziegfeld married actress Billie Burke on April 11, 1914.  They had met at a New Year's Eve party. They had one child, Patricia Ziegfeld Stephenson (1916–2008). The family lived on his estate in Hastings-on-Hudson, New York, and in Palm Beach, Florida.
Ziegfeld died in Hollywood, California on July 22, 1932, from pleurisy, related to a previous lung infection. He had been in Los Angeles only a few days after moving from a New Mexico sanitarium. His death left Burke with substantial debts, driving her toward film acting to settle them. She died on May 14, 1970.  He and Burke are interred in Kensico Cemetery in Valhalla, New York.

Accolades
Ziegfeld was elected to the American Theatre Hall of Fame.

Broadway theatre productions

{| class="wikitable sortable collapsible"
|-
!scope=col colspan=3| Broadway theatre productions
|-
!scope=col| Date
!scope=col| Title
!scope=col class="unsortable" | Notes
|-
| style="text-align:right;"| 1896 ||  || Herald Square Theatre
|-
| style="text-align:right;"| 1898 ||  || Herald Square Theatre
|-
| style="text-align:right;"| 1898 || Way Down East || Manhattan Theatre
|-
| style="text-align:right;"| 1898 ||  || Manhattan Theatre
|-
| style="text-align:right;"| 1899 || Mlle. Fifi || Manhattan Theatre
|-
| style="text-align:right;"| 1899 ||  || Manhattan Theatre
|-
| style="text-align:right;"| 1899–1900 || Papa's Wife || Manhattan Theatre
|-
| style="text-align:right;"| 1901–1902 ||  || Casino Theatre, Grand Opera House
|-
| style="text-align:right;"| 1903–1904 || Red Feather || Lyric Theatre, Grand Opera House
|-
| style="text-align:right;"| 1903–1904 || Mam'selle Napoleon || Knickerbocker Theatre
|-
| style="text-align:right;"| 1904–1905 || Higgledy-Piggledy || Weber and Fields' Broadway Music Hall
|-
| style="text-align:right;"| 1905 || Higgledy-Piggledy || Weber and Fields' Broadway Music Hall
|-
| style="text-align:right;"| 1906–1907 ||  || Broadway Theatre
|-
| style="text-align:right;"| 1907 || Follies of 1907 || Jardin de Paris, Liberty Theatre, Grand Opera House
|-
| style="text-align:right;"| 1908 ||  || Broadway Theatre
|-
| style="text-align:right;"| 1908 ||  || New York Theatre
|-
| style="text-align:right;"| 1908 || Follies of 1908 || Jardin de Paris, New York Theatre
|-
| style="text-align:right;"| 1908–1909 || Miss Innocence || New York Theatre
|-
| style="text-align:right;"| 1909 || Follies of 1909 || Jardin de Paris
|-
| style="text-align:right;"| 1909 || Miss Innocence || New York Theatre
|-
| style="text-align:right;"| 1910 || Follies of 1910 || Jardin de Paris
|-
| style="text-align:right;"| 1911 || Ziegfeld Follies of 1911 || Jardin de Paris
|-
| style="text-align:right;"| 1912 || Over the River || Globe Theatre
|-
| style="text-align:right;"| 1912 ||  || Moulin Rouge
|-
| style="text-align:right;"| 1912–1913 || Ziegfeld Follies of 1912 || Moulin Rouge
|-
| style="text-align:right;"| 1913 || Ziegfeld Follies of 1913 || Moulin Rouge
|-
| style="text-align:right;"| 1914 || Ziegfeld Follies of 1914 || New Amsterdam Theatre
|-
| style="text-align:right;"| 1915 || Ziegfeld Follies of 1915 || New Amsterdam Theatre
|-
| style="text-align:right;"| 1916 || Ziegfeld Follies of 1916 || New Amsterdam Theatre
|-
| style="text-align:right;"| 1916–1917 ||  || Century Theatre
|-
| style="text-align:right;"| 1917 || Dance and Grow Thin || Cocoanut Grove Theatre
|-
| style="text-align:right;"| 1917 || Ziegfeld Follies of 1917 || New Amsterdam Theatre
|-
| style="text-align:right;"| 1917 ||  || Hudson Theatre
|-
| style="text-align:right;"| 1917–1918 || Miss 1917 || Century Theatre
|-
| style="text-align:right;"| 1917–1918 ||  || Cocoanut Grove Theatre
|-
| style="text-align:right;"| 1918 || Ziegfeld Follies of 1918 || New Amsterdam Theatre, Globe Theatre
|-
| style="text-align:right;"| 1918 || Ziegfeld Midnight Frolic || Ziegfeld Roof
|-
| style="text-align:right;"| 1918 || By Pigeon Post || George M. Cohan's Theatre
|-
| style="text-align:right;"| 1919 || Ziegfeld Follies of 1919 || New Amsterdam Theatre
|-
| style="text-align:right;"| 1919 || Ziegfeld Nine O'Clock Review || New Amsterdam Theatre Roof
|-
| style="text-align:right;"| 1919 || Ziegfeld Midnight Frolic || Danse de Follies
|-
| style="text-align:right;"| 1919 || Caesar's Wife || Liberty Theatre
|-
| style="text-align:right;"| 1919–1920 || Elsie Janis and Her Gang || George M. Cohan's Theatre
|-
| style="text-align:right;"| 1920 || Ziegfeld Girls of 1920 || Danse de Follies
|-
| style="text-align:right;"| 1920 || Ziegfeld Follies of 1920 || New Amsterdam Theatre
|-
| style="text-align:right;"| 1920–1922 || Sally || New Amsterdam Theatre
|-
| style="text-align:right;"| 1921 || Ziegfeld Midnight Frolic || Ziegfeld Roof
|-
| style="text-align:right;"| 1921 || Ziegfeld 9 O'Clock Frolic || Danse de Follies
|-
| style="text-align:right;"| 1921 || Ziegfeld Follies of 1921 || Globe Theatre
|-
| style="text-align:right;"| 1921–1922 ||  || Henry Miller's Theatre
|-
| style="text-align:right;"| 1921–1922 || Ziegfeld Midnight Frolic || Danse de Follies
|-
| style="text-align:right;"| 1922 || Ziegfeld Follies of 1922 || New Amsterdam Theatre
|-
| style="text-align:right;"| 1922–1923 || Rose Briar || Empire Theatre
|-
| style="text-align:right;"| 1923 || Ziegfeld Follies of 1923 || New Amsterdam Theatre
|-
| style="text-align:right;"| 1923 || Sally || New Amsterdam Theatre
|-
| style="text-align:right;"| 1923–1924 || Ziegfeld Follies of 1923 || New Amsterdam Theatre
|-
| style="text-align:right;"| 1923–1925 || Kid Boots || Earl Carroll Theatre, Selwyn Theatre
|-
| style="text-align:right;"| 1924–1925 || Ziegfeld Follies of 1924 || New Amsterdam Theatre
|-
| style="text-align:right;"| 1924–1925 || Annie Dear || Times Square Theatre
|-
| style="text-align:right;"| 1925 || Louis the 14th || Cosmopolitan Theatre
|-
| style="text-align:right;"| 1925 || Ziegfeld Follies of 1925 || New Amsterdam Theatre
|-
| style="text-align:right;"| 1926 || No Foolin''' || Globe Theatre
|-
| style="text-align:right;"| 1926–1927 || Betsy || New Amsterdam Theatre
|-
| style="text-align:right;"| 1927–1928 || Rio Rita || Ziegfeld Theatre, Lyric Theatre, Majestic Theatre
|-
| style="text-align:right;"| 1927–1928 || Ziegfeld Follies of 1927 || New Amsterdam Theatre
|-
| style="text-align:right;"| 1927–1929 || Show Boat || Ziegfeld Theatre
|-
| style="text-align:right;"| 1928 || Rosalie || Ziegfeld Theatre
|-
| style="text-align:right;"| 1928 ||  || Lyric Theatre
|-
| style="text-align:right;"| 1928–1929 || Whoopee! || New Amsterdam Theatre
|-
| style="text-align:right;"| 1929 || Ziegfeld Midnight Frolic || Frolic Theatre
|-
| style="text-align:right;"| 1929 || Show Girl || Ziegfeld Theatre
|-
| style="text-align:right;"| 1929–1930 || Bitter Sweet || Ziegfeld Theatre, Shubert Theatre
|-
| style="text-align:right;"| 1930 || Simple Simon || Ziegfeld Theatre
|-
| style="text-align:right;"| 1930–1931 || Smiles || Ziegfeld Theatre
|-
| style="text-align:right;"| 1931 || Ziegfeld Follies of 1931 || Ziegfeld Theatre
|-
| style="text-align:right;"| 1932 || Hot-Cha! || Ziegfeld Theatre
|-
| style="text-align:right;"| 1932 || Show Boat || Casino Theatre
|}

Films
Ziegfeld appears in a sound prologue to the 1929 film, Show Boat—a part-talkie based on Edna Ferber's 1926 novel, not the popular stage adaptation that was still playing on Broadway when the film was released. Universal Pictures originally made Show Boat as a silent, and obtained the rights to the popular Broadway score after the film was shot. The 18-minute prologue is introduced by Ziegfeld and producer Carl Laemmle, and features excerpts from the stage production performed by cast members Jules Bledsoe, Tess Gardella, Helen Morgan and the Broadway chorus. Two subsequent adaptations of Show Boat, in 1936 and 1951, were based on the stage musical.

Technicolor screen versions of three of Ziegfeld's stage musicals were produced in the early sound film era. RKO Pictures had its first hit with its lavish presentation of Rio Rita (1929), starring Bebe Daniels and John Boles.

Marilyn Miller reprised one of her greatest stage successes in Sally (1929). Eddie Cantor reprised his popular Broadway role in Whoopee! (1930), which Ziegfeld himself produced with Samuel Goldwyn.

Cultural references

In 1936 Metro-Goldwyn-Mayer released a semi-biographical film extravaganza, The Great Ziegfeld, starring William Powell. He was personally chosen for the role by Billie Burke, who felt that while Powell did not physically resemble her late husband, he possessed the right manner. "What I tried to do primarily was to get across the essential spirit of the man", Powell later said, "his love for show business, his exquisite taste, his admiration for the beauty of women. He was financially impractical but aesthetically impeccable—a genius in his chosen field." Nominated for seven Academy Awards, The Great Ziegfeld received Oscars for Best Picture, Best Actress (Luise Rainer as Anna Held), and Best Dance Direction (Seymour Felix), for the astonishingly opulent production number, "A Pretty Girl Is Like a Melody"—one of the most famous musical sequences ever filmed. It was MGM's most expensive production since Ben-Hur (1925), and it made back twice its cost.

Released by MGM ten years later, Ziegfeld Follies (1946) was an all-star revue that includes Powell in a cameo role as Ziegfeld. A 1978 NBC-television film, Ziegfeld: The Man and His Women, stars Paul Shenar as Ziegfeld. Directed by Buzz Kulik, the three-hour biopicBerard, Jeanette M.; Corwin, Norman; Englund, Klaudia.

Ziegfeld appears as a character in a number of films:
 The Jolson Story (1946), played by Eddie Kane
 I'll See You in My Dreams (1951), played by William Forrest
 The Story of Will Rogers (1952), played by William Forrest
 The I Don't Care Girl (1953), played by Wilton Graff
 The Eddie Cantor Story (1953), played by William Forrest
 The Helen Morgan Story (1957), played by Walter Woolf King
 Funny Girl (1968), played by Walter Pidgeon; played by Roger DeKoven in the original Broadway stage production
 W. C. Fields and Me (1976), played by Paul Stewart

Archive
The Academy Film Archive houses the Florenz Ziegfeld-Billie Burke Collection. The collection consists primarily of home movies.

Further reading
Carter, Randolph, Ziegfeld, the Time of His Life, New and rev. ed., London, Bernard Press, 1988; 
Redniss, Lauren, Century Girl: 100 Years in the Life of Doris Eaton Travis, Last Living Star of the Ziegfeld Follies'', New York, Harper Collins, 2006; .

References

External links

 
 
 
 Ziegfeld Productions, 1915–1932, Joseph Urban Collection, Columbia University Libraries
 Joseph Urban Stage Design Models & Documents, Joseph Urban Collection, Columbia University Libraries – Photographs of select designs for Ziegfeld shows
 Flo Ziegfeld-Billie Burke Papers, 1907–1984, held by the Billy Rose Theatre Division, New York Public Library for the Performing Arts

1867 births
1932 deaths
Businesspeople from Chicago
American people of Belgian descent
American people of German descent
American theatre directors
American theatre managers and producers
Impresarios
Ziegfeld Follies
Burials at Kensico Cemetery
Infectious disease deaths in California
Deaths from pleurisy